Wabenzi is an Anglicization of the  pejorative Bantu colloquialism WaBenzi, originally used in Kenya to refer to members of the new ruling class that superseded the colonial regime, that has come to refer to the new ruling class in any post-colonial African country. The term usually refers to a corrupt government official, or family member of one, and derives from their being seen as driving an imported car. "Wa" is a prefix that refers to people in some Bantu languages; "benzi" comes from Mercedes-Benz, a car perceived as prestigious. The Anglicized spelling form is more common than the original Bantu WaBenzi.

See also
 Black Diamonds

References

External links 
https://web.archive.org/web/20090926152125/http://encarta.msn.com:80/dictionary_561539700/wabenzi.html

Class-related slurs
Colloquial terms
Corruption in Kenya
Society of Kenya
Upper class